Wyoming Highway 224 (WYO 224) is a short  unsigned Wyoming State Road for the Wyoming Department of Transportation (WYDOT) Headquarters and the central Wyoming Department of Fish & Game offices, located in Cheyenne.

Route description
Unsigned Wyoming Highway 224 travels from exit 12 of Interstate 25/U.S. Route 87 west to the Wyoming Department of Transportation (WYDOT) Headquarters and the central Wyoming Department of Fish & Game. If headed north on I-25 BUS, US 85, and US 87 BUS (Central Avenue) and cross Interstate 25, continue straight on Central Avenue for the last quarter of a mile. This route is not signed. Milepost 0.00 is the junction with I-25/US 87 and US 85, I-25 Business/US 87 Business. The Wyoming Department of Fish and Game Headquarters is at Milepost 0.05, and the Wyoming Department of Transportation entrance is at Milepost 0.06. The main visitors parking area in the entrance is at Milepost 0.07, and other parking areas are at Milepost 0.09.

Major intersections

References

External links 

Cheyenne @ AARoads.com
Wyoming State Routes 200-299
WYO 224 - I-25/I-25 BUS/US 85/US 87/US 87 BUS to WYDOT Headquarters
Wyoming Department of Transportation

224
Transportation in Laramie County, Wyoming
224
State highways in the United States shorter than one mile